Zhu Qingyuan (born 17 May 1957) is a Chinese fencer. She competed in the women's individual and team foil events at the 1984 and 1988 Summer Olympics.

References

1957 births
Living people
Chinese female fencers
Olympic fencers of China
Fencers at the 1984 Summer Olympics
Fencers at the 1988 Summer Olympics
Asian Games medalists in fencing
Fencers at the 1978 Asian Games
Fencers at the 1986 Asian Games
Asian Games gold medalists for China
Asian Games silver medalists for China
Asian Games bronze medalists for China
Medalists at the 1978 Asian Games
Medalists at the 1986 Asian Games
20th-century Chinese women